"Don't Stop Believin" is the title track from the 1976 album by Olivia Newton-John. Written and composed specifically for Newton-John by John Farrar. It was released in August 1976 as the album's lead single. It peaked at number thirty-three on the Billboard Hot 100. It was her seventh number one on the Easy Listening chart, spending one week at the top of the chart in September 1976. The single also went to number fourteen on the country chart.

Newton-John re-recorded the track for her 2005 album Stronger Than Before. She also titled her 2019 memoir after the song.

Juliana Hatfield covered the song on her album Juliana Hatfield Sings Olivia Newton-John.

Track listing
 "Don't Stop Believin'" – 3:39
 "Greensleeves" – 3:42

Charts

See also
List of number-one adult contemporary singles of 1976 (U.S.)

References

External links
 

1976 songs
1976 singles
Olivia Newton-John songs
Songs written by John Farrar
Song recordings produced by John Farrar
MCA Records singles